Milan Jovanović (born 24 January 1998) is a Serbian handball player who plays for RK Metaloplastika and the Serbian national team.

He participated at the 2018 European Men's Handball Championship.

References

1998 births
Living people
People from Vrbas, Serbia
Serbian male handball players